Ken Whitmore, born Hanley, Staffordshire, December 22, 1937, is a prolific author of radio plays, stage plays, short stories and poetry.  His writing is characterised by black comedy and fantastic ideas, such as the complete disappearance of a man’s house, family and dog (One of Our Commuters is Missing) and the need for all mankind to jump in the air simultaneously (Jump! - a work which was produced on radio, stage, TV and as a book.)

His first radio play in 1974 was Haywire at Humbleford Flag and there swiftly followed a stream of high-quality radio plays, ending with The Final Twist (from a stage play written in collaboration with Alfred Bradley.)

Whitmore’s adaptations for radio are Going Under from the novel by the Russian Lydia Chukovskaya, a five-part adaptation of Brighton Rock by Graham Greene, and an eight-part adaptation of Fame is the Spur by Howard Spring.

His published stage plays are Jump for Your Life, Pen Friends, La Bolshie Vita, The Final Twist and The Turn of the Screw, adapted from the story by Henry James.

Paul Donovan on TimesOnline quoted Whitmore as saying that his dearest wish was to write a drama that would stop people ironing.

Works for Radio

One of our Commuters is Missing
Jump for your life!
The Story of a Penny Suit
Colder Than of Late
Out for the Count
The Caucasian in the Woodpile
Pen Friends
Watch the Forest Grow
The Lackey's Daughter
Always in Love with Amy
A Decent British Murder
The Sport of Angels
The Great Times Crossword Conspiracy
Travelling Hopefully
La Bolshie Vita
Dithering Heights
The Red Telephone Box
The Town that Helped Itself
The Gingerbread House (Winner of the Giles Cooper Award for best plays radio of the year)
The Cold Embrace
Winter Music
A Room in Budapest
The Final Twist

References

External links
 Diversity website
 Ken Whitmore's blog

1937 births
British writers
Living people
People from Hanley, Staffordshire